Romeo Constantin Surdu (born 12 January 1984) is a Romanian footballer and manager.

Club career
Born in Brașov, Surdu began his football career at FC Brașov. During the summer of 2005 he was traded to CFR Cluj.

Steaua
On 22 August 2007, he signed a four-year contract with Steaua București. On 2 September 2007 played his first match in Steaua's shirt against Unirea Urziceni. In the first season with the team he didn't make a direct impact, playing just 12 league games for the Bucharest team.

Loan to FC Braşov
For the 2008–09 season he was loaned to his former club FC Brașov where he had a fantastic season. He scored 8 goals, helping FC Brașov finish 1 point from qualifying for UEFA Europa League.

Return to Steaua
In the summer of 2009 he returned to Steaua București. Surdu scored the first goal in Steaua's shirt against Újpest in the second qualifying round of Europa League, on 16 July 2009. He scored his first goal for Steaua in Liga I in a draw against his former team CFR Cluj, after an assist by Bogdan Stancu. He scored on 23 August 2009 the only goal in Steaua's victory against Oțelul Galați. In the second year with the team he won a place in the starting 11 and played with Steaua București in the UEFA Europa League.

In the second round, he scored the victory goal for Steaua against FC U Craiova. Steaua won home with 2–1. In the fifth round, he scored his first brace at Steaua against FC Vaslui, first goal in 5th minute and the last goal in the 55th minute, Steaua winning away with 3–0.

In June 2011, Surdu left Steaua.

Rapid
On 5 June 2011, Surdu signed a two-year contract with Rapid Bucharest. He made his debut on July in a 3–0 win over FC Vaslui scoring the second goal of the game. He ended his contract by mutual agreement in December 2012, after the club was placed under administration.

Apollon Limassol
In January 2013, Surdu signed a contract for 18 months with Apollon Limassol, in the Cypriot First Division.

FC Braşov
On 5 September 2013, Surdu returns to Brașov and he signed a contract for one year.

Milsami Orhei
In July 2014, he moved to FC Milsami Orhei, in the Republic of Moldova.

International career
Surdu played as a youth for the Romania U-19, as well as the Romania U-21.

In August 2009 he was call-up by the Răzvan Lucescu in the Romanian against Hungary. He made his debut for Romania on 12 August 2009 against Hungary, coming on in the 46th minute to replace Ionel Dănciulescu. He has since the played six games for the national side.

Coaching career
On 14 February 2020 it was confirmed, that Surdu had returned to FC Milsami Orhei in his first experience as head coach. However, Surdu decided to resign two weeks later, on 3 March 2020. Surdu later explained, that he coached the team without signing a contract with the club. After two weeks, they were about to sign a contract but didn't agree on the duration of the deal, which led him to leave the club.

Career statistics

Club
(Correct as of 6 August 2015)

Honours

Club
Steaua București
 Romanian Cup: 2010–11

Apollon Limassol
 Cypriot Cup: 2012–13

Milsami Orhei
Moldovan National Division: 2014–15
Moldovan Cup: 2017–18

References

External links
 
 

1984 births
Living people
Sportspeople from Brașov
Association football wingers
Association football forwards
Romanian footballers
Romanian expatriate footballers
Romania international footballers
Romania youth international footballers
Romania under-21 international footballers
FC Brașov (1936) players
SR Brașov players
CFR Cluj players
FC Steaua București players
FC Rapid București players
Apollon Limassol FC players
FC Milsami Orhei players
ASA 2013 Târgu Mureș players
R.W.D. Molenbeek players
FCV Farul Constanța players
Liga I players
Cypriot First Division players
Romanian expatriate sportspeople in Belgium
Romanian expatriate sportspeople in Cyprus
Romanian expatriate sportspeople in Moldova
Expatriate footballers in Cyprus
Expatriate footballers in Belgium
Expatriate footballers in Moldova
Romanian football managers
FC Milsami Orhei managers
Expatriate football managers in Moldova